This article contains information about the literary events and publications of 1989.

Events
February 14 – Ayatollah Ruhollah Khomeini, Supreme Leader of Iran (died 3 June 1989), issues a fatwa calling for the death of Indian-born British author Salman Rushdie and his publishers for issuing the novel The Satanic Verses (1988). On February 24 Iran places a US $3 million bounty on Rushdie's head. On August 3, 1989, a bomb kills Mustafa Mazeh in London as he attempts to plant it in a hotel, in order to carry out the fatwa.
March 1 – The Berne Convention Implementation Act of 1988 comes into effect in the United States, making the country a party to the Berne Convention for the Protection of Literary and Artistic Works of 1886.
April 23 – Leading figures of the theatre mark William Shakespeare's birthday with a street party to oppose the destruction of the recently-discovered archaeological remains of the English Renaissance Rose Theatre and Globe theatres in London.
October – The National Library of Norway is established, with a new building at Mo i Rana.
December 29 – Playwright Václav Havel becomes President of Czechoslovakia.

New books

Fiction
Hanan al-Shaykh – Women of Sand and Myrrh (Misk al–ghazal)
Martin Amis – London Fields
Piers Anthony – Total Recall
Iain Banks – Canal Dreams
John Banville – The Book of Evidence
Clive Barker – The Great and Secret Show
Julian Barnes – A History of the World in 10½ Chapters
Thomas Berger – Changing the Past
Larry Bond – Red Phoenix
Anthony Burgess – Any Old Iron
Nick Cave – And the Ass Saw the Angel
Tom Clancy – Clear and Present Danger
Mary Higgins Clark – While My Pretty One Sleeps
Hugh Cook – The Wicked and the Witless
Bernard Cornwell
Sharpe's Revenge
Sea Lord (aka Killer's Wake)
Bryce Courtenay – The Power of One
Robert Crais – Stalking the Angel
Lindsey Davis – The Silver Pigs
L. Sprague de Camp
The Honorable Barbarian
(with Fletcher Pratt) – The Complete Compleat Enchanter
E. L. Doctorow – Billy Bathgate
Katherine Dunn – Geek Love
Umberto Eco – Foucault's Pendulum
George Alec Effinger – A Fire in the Sun
Mircea Eliade (died 1986) – Diary of a Short-Sighted Adolescent (Romanul adolescentului miop) (written 1921–1925)
Ben Elton – Stark
Steve Erickson – Tours of the Black Clock
Laura Esquivel – Like Water for Chocolate (Como agua para chocolate)
Ken Follett – The Pillars of the Earth
Frederick Forsyth – The Negotiator
Gabriel García Márquez – The General in His Labyrinth (El general en su laberinto)
John Gardner
Licence to Kill
Win, Lose or Die
Charles Gill – The Boozer Challenge
John Grisham – A Time to Kill
A. M. Homes – Jack
Robert E. Howard, L. Sprague de Camp and Lin Carter – The Conan Chronicles
John Irving – A Prayer for Owen Meany
Kazuo Ishiguro – The Remains of the Day
Fleur Jaeggy – :it:I beati anni del castigo (Sweet Days of Discipline)
Randall Kenan – A Visitation of Spirits
Elias Khoury – رحلة غاندي الصغير (Rihlat Ghandi al-saghir, The Journey of Little Gandhi)
Stephen King – The Dark Half
László Krasznahorkai – The Melancholy of Resistance (Az ellenállás melankóliája)
Joe R. Lansdale
Cold in July
By Bizarre Hands
John le Carré – The Russia House
H. P. Lovecraft – The Horror in the Museum and Other Revisions (corrected edition)
Hilary Mantel – Fludd
Javier Marías – Todas las almas (All Souls)
James A. Michener – Six Days in Havana
Hanna Mina – The End of a Brave Man (Nihayat Rajul Shujaa)
Bharati Mukherjee – Jasmine
Larry Niven – The Legacy of Heorot
Robert B. Parker – Playmates
Ellis Peters
The Heretic's Apprentice
The Potter's Field
Giuseppe Pontiggia – La grande sera
Terry Pratchett
Guards! Guards!'PyramidsPaul Quarrington – Whale MusicMordecai Richler – Solomon Gursky Was HereGiampaolo Rugarli – Il nido di ghiaccioJosé Saramago – The History of the Siege of LisbonSidney Sheldon – The Sands of TimeDan Simmons – HyperionJohn Skipp and Craig Spector – Book of the DeadDanielle SteelDaddyStarBruce Sterling – Crystal ExpressAlexander Stuart – The War ZoneAmy Tan – The Joy Luck ClubShashi Tharoor – The Great Indian NovelRose Tremain – RestorationJane Vandenburgh – Failure to Zig-ZagAndrew Vachss – Hard CandyAlice Walker – The Temple of My FamiliarRobert McLiam Wilson – Ripley BogleRoger ZelaznyFrost & Fire (short stories and essays)Knight of ShadowsChildren and young people
Verna Aardema – Rabbit Makes a Monkey of LionJoyce Barkhouse – Pit PonyBruce Coville – My Teacher Is an AlienAnne FineBill's New FrockGoggle-EyesMark Helprin (with Chris Van Allsburg) – Swan LakeYoshi Kogo – Big AlNorman Maclean (with Barry Moser) – A River Runs Through ItBill Martin Jr. (with Lois Ehlert) – Chicka Chicka Boom BoomDavid McKee – ElmerJim Murphy – The Call Of The WolvesBill Peet – Bill Peet: An AutobiographyRobert D. San Souci – The Talking Eggs: A Folktale from the American SouthJon Scieszka (with Lane Smith) – The True Story of the 3 Little Pigs!R. L. Stine – The New Girl (first in the Fear Street series of 55 books)
Christopher Tolkien (with J. R. R. Tolkien and Alan Lee) – The Treason of IsengardHélène Desputeaux – CaillouMichael Rosen – We're Going on a Bear HuntDrama
Herman Brusselmans and Tom Lanoye – De Canadese muur (The Canadian Wall)
Jim Cartwright – TwoNick Darke – Kissing the Pope (original title: Campesinos)
Michael Wall – Amongst BarbariansKeith Waterhouse – Jeffrey Bernard is UnwellPoetry

Simon Armitage – Zoom!Paul Fleischman – Joyful Noise: Poems for Two VoicesDavid Lehman – The Best American Poetry 1989Non-fiction
Gisela Bleibtreu-Ehrenberg – Angst und VorurteilBill Bryson – The Lost Continent: Travels in Small-Town AmericaRodney Cotterill – No Ghost in the Machine: Modern Science and the Brain, the Mind, and the SoulStephen R. Covey – The Seven Habits of Highly Effective PeopleBruno Dagens – Angkor: Heart of an Asian EmpireWilliam Dalrymple – In Xanadu: A QuestCynthia Enloe – Bananas, Beaches and BasesStanley Hauerwas and William Willimon – Resident Aliens: Life in the Christian ColonyRüdiger Imhof – John Banville: A Critical Introduction, the first full-length appraisal of the work of major turn of the century writer John Banville. Weekend.
Tim Jeal – Baden-PowellBob Kane and Tom Andrae – Batman and MeJohn Keegan – The Face of BattleDale Maharidge and Michael Williamson – And Their Children After ThemPeter Mayle – A Year in ProvenceClaudia Moatti – The Search for Ancient RomeAnn Moir and David Jessel – Brain SexNew Revised Standard Version of the Bible
Michael Palin – Around the World in 80 DaysHarold Perkin – The Rise of Professional Society. England Since 1880Gilda Radner – It's Always SomethingPeter Sloterdijk – Infinite Mobilization (Eurotaoismus)
Dan Topolski and Patrick Robinson – True Blue: The Oxford Boat Race MutinyV. Vale and Andrea Juno – Modern PrimitivesAndy Warhol and Pat Hackett – The Andy Warhol DiariesJeremy Wilson – Lawrence of Arabia: The Authorized Biography of T.E. LawrenceBob Wood – Big Ten CountryBirths
August 26 - Sara Raasch, American young-adult fiction writer

Deaths
January 4 – Srikrishna Alanahalli, Indian novelist and poet (born 1947)
January 8 – Bruce Chatwin, English travel writer and novelist (born 1940)
February 3 – John Cassavetes, American actor, director and writer (born 1929)
February 12 – Thomas Bernhard, Austrian author (born 1931)
March 14 – Edward Abbey, American essayist (born 1927)
March 27 – Malcolm Cowley, American novelist and poet (born 1898)
April 14 – Laurence Meynell (Valerie Baxter, A. Stephen Tring), English novelist and children's writer (born 1899)
April 19 – Daphne du Maurier, English novelist (born 1907)
May 19 – C. L. R. James, Trinidad-born American journalist (born 1901)
May 20 – Erzsébet Galgóczi, Hungarian novelist, playwright and screenwriter (born 1930)
July 31 – Zhou Yang, Chinese literary theorist (born 1908)
August 23 – R. D. Laing, Scottish psychologist and author (born 1927)
August 26 – Irving Stone, American novelist (born 1903)
September 4
Georges Simenon, Belgian novelist and crime writer (born 1903)
Sir Ronald Syme, New Zealand classicist (born 1903)
September 13 – Acharya Aatreya, Telugu screenwriter (born 1921)
September 15 – Robert Penn Warren, American poet and novelist (born 1905)
September 30
Horace Alexander, English current-affairs writer and ornithologist (born 1909)
Oskar Davičo, Serbian novelist and poet (born 1909)
October 13 – Cesare Zavattini, Italian screenwriter (born 1902)
November 22 – José Guadalupe Cruz, Mexican comics writer (born 1917)
December 5 – George Selden (Terry Andrews), American children's author (gastrointestinal bleeding, born 1929)
December 19 – Stella Gibbons, English novelist (born 1902)
December 22 – Samuel Beckett, Irish-born playwright, novelist and poet (born 1906)
December 26 – Paul Jennings, English humorist (born 1918)

Awards
Nobel Prize for Literature: Camilo José Cela
Europe Theatre Prize: Peter Brook
Camões Prize (first award): Miguel Torga

Australia
The Australian/Vogel Literary Award: Mandy Sayer, Mood IndigoC. J. Dennis Prize for Poetry: Gwen Harwood, Bone ScanKenneth Slessor Prize for Poetry: John Tranter, Under BerlinMary Gilmore Prize: Alex Skovron, The Re-arrangementMiles Franklin Award: Peter Carey, Oscar and LucindaCanada
See 1989 Governor General's Awards for a complete list of winners and finalists for those awards.

France
Prix Goncourt: Jean Vautrin, Un grand Pas vers le Bon DieuPrix Décembre: Guy Dupré, Les Manœuvres d'automnePrix Médicis French: Serge Doubrovsky, Le Livre briséPrix Médicis International: Alvaro Mutis, La Neige de l'amiralUnited Kingdom
Booker Prize: Kazuo Ishiguro – The Remains of the DayCarnegie Medal for children's literature: Anne Fine, Goggle-EyesCholmondeley Award: Peter Didsbury, Douglas Dunn, E. J. Scovell
Eric Gregory Award: Gerard Woodward, David Morley, Katrina Porteous, Paul Henry
James Tait Black Memorial Prize for fiction: James Kelman, A DisaffectionJames Tait Black Memorial Prize for biography: Ian Gibson, Federico Garcia Lorca: A LifeNewdigate prize: Jane Griffiths
Queen's Gold Medal for Poetry: Allen Curnow
Whitbread Best Book Award: Richard Holmes, Coleridge: Early VisionsThe Sunday Express Book of the Year: Rose Tremain, RestorationUnited States
Agnes Lynch Starrett Poetry Prize: Nancy Vieira Couto, The Face in the WaterAiken Taylor Award for Modern American Poetry: Anthony Hecht
American Academy of Arts and Letters Gold Medal for Fiction, Isaac Bashevis Singer
Bernard F. Connors Prize for Poetry: Jorie Graham, "Spring"
Compton Crook Award: Elizabeth Moon, Sheepfarmer's DaughterFrost Medal: Gwendolyn Brooks
National Book Critics Circle Award: to The Broken Cord by Michael Dorris
National Book Award for Fiction: to Spartina by John Casey
Nebula Award: Elizabeth Ann Scarborough, The Healer's WarNewbery Medal for children's literature: Paul Fleischman, Joyful NoisePEN/Faulkner Award for Fiction: to Dusk and Other Stories by James Salter
Pulitzer Prize for Drama: Wendy Wasserstein, The Heidi ChroniclesPulitzer Prize for Fiction: Anne Tyler – Breathing LessonsPulitzer Prize for Poetry: Richard Wilbur: New and Collected PoemsWhiting Awards:
Fiction: Ellen Akins, Marianne Wiggins
Nonfiction: Ian Frazier, Natalie Kusz, Lucy Sante, Tobias Wolff (nonfiction/fiction)
Plays: Timberlake Wertenbaker
Poetry: Russell Edson, Mary Karr, C.D. Wright

Japan
Falcon Award (Maltese Falcon Society of Japan): Andrew Vachss for StregaThe Japan Fantasy Novel Award is established, with Ken'ichi Sakemi winning with his novel Kōkyū Shōsetsu''.

References

 
Years of the 20th century in literature